The Contender 2 is a reality television show based on the sport of boxing, but with an element of the (welterweight) competitor's lives and relationships with each other within the show's living quarters, based in Pasadena, California. Filmed in January and February 2006, the show began airing on July 18, 2006.  The winner of The Contender Season 2 was decided in a bout at the Staples Center, Los Angeles, broadcast live on September 26, 2006, winning a purse of US$500,000. The Contender 2 was shown on ESPN in the US, in the UK on ITV4, in Canada on TSN, in Australia on FOX8, in New Zealand on TV2, and on AXN in South and Southeast Asia.

The show took the format of a gameshow, with the boxers divided into two teams (blue and gold) in a "playground pick" on the first episode.  These teams competed for the right to choose which of their team members fights that week, and who he fights against. The second half of the hour long episodes are mostly taken up with that fight: the loser is eliminated.

The program was hosted by Sugar Ray Leonard, former champion boxer.  Sylvester Stallone, who famously portrayed the boxer Rocky Balboa in the Rocky series of films, is the show's executive producer. It was also produced by Mark Burnett.  Unlike in season 1, Stallone does not appear on camera; at the time the series was taped, he was making Rocky Balboa, the sixth installment in the Rocky movie series.  The movie premiered in December 2006.

Contestants

Episode guide
Episode numbers refer to the progression of matches in the tourney.  Episodes one and two aired together at full length, while seven and eight, eleven and twelve, and thirteen and fourteen were one-hour "doubleheaders" featuring two bouts.

Tournament Tracker
While The Contender: Season 2 is a reality TV show, it does contain a serious competition with a proper format - a 16-man knockout tournament.

Preliminary round
1. Cornelius (B) beat Michael C (G) by majority decision.
2. Norberto (B) beat Rudy (G) by split decision.
3. Gary (G) beat Aaron (B) by split decision.
4. Walter (G) beat Andre (B) by unanimous decision.
5. Grady (B) beat Vinroy (G) by unanimous decision.
6. Michael S (B) beat Ebo (G) by KO.
7. Nick (B) beat Jeff (G) by unanimous decision.
8. Steve (G) beat Freddy (B) by unanimous decision.

Quarterfinals
Quarterfinal bouts are determined by the individual winner of each preliminary bout. The winner can choose which episode they will box in, and may choose their own opponent.
9. Steve beat Nick by split decision.
10. Cornelius beat Walter by unanimous decision.
11. Grady beat Michael by unanimous decision.
12. Norberto beat Gary by unanimous decision.

Semifinals
Semifinal bouts are determined by the individual winner of each quarterfinal bout.  The winner can choose which episode they will box in, and may choose their own opponent.
13. Steve beat Cornelius by unanimous decision.
14. Grady beat Norberto by majority decision.

Finals
15. Grady beat Steve by split decision to win the contender title.

Grady got ahead early with body shots. Steve then beat him inside in the 4th and 5th. There was slow fighting until the end of the bout, but Grady landed more punches in the final 5 rounds. Grady won in a split decision. The scores were: David Mendoza 93–97, Max DeLuca 96–94 and José Cobián 94–96.

For third place, Cornelius beat Norberto by TKO in the 7th round of 8.  Cornelius knocked Norberto down in the 2nd, and was eventually penalized a point for shoving, but overall the match was one-sided, as Cornelius simply jabbed and set up straight rights to win.

As undercard bouts on the final, Walter beat Vinroy by TKO in the 4th of 6, Freddy beat Aaron by unanimous decision in 6, and Nick beat Nurhan Suleymanoglu by unanimous decision in 6.

Storm Large, who was a contestant on Burnett's Rock Star: Supernova, sang "The Star-Spangled Banner" prior to the card.
   
(Numbers refer to the episode in which the fight took place.)

Weekly results

 Cornflower blue and WIN means the boxer won the match.
 Red and LOSE means the boxer lost the match.

Guest appearances
A number of professional athletes appeared on the show, offering advice to the contestants, including:

 Peter Manfredo Jr.
 Sergio Mora
 Alfonso Gomez
 "Sugar" Shane Mosley
 Willie McGinest

Trainers
 Tommy Gallagher
 Jeremy Williams

References

External links
Official website
The Contender: Season Two - Everything You Need to Know
The Boxing Times

2006 American television seasons
2